Walter Márquez Busto (28 October 1936 – 3 August 2012) was an Uruguayan former basketball player who competed in the 1964 Summer Olympics.

References

External links
 

1936 births
2012 deaths
Uruguayan men's basketball players
1963 FIBA World Championship players
1967 FIBA World Championship players
Olympic basketball players of Uruguay
Basketball players at the 1963 Pan American Games
Basketball players at the 1964 Summer Olympics
Pan American Games competitors for Uruguay